The Blind Beggar is a pub on Whitechapel Road in the East End of London, England.

Due to its location close to Whitechapel Station, the pub is generally described as being in Whitechapel; it is however located just on the Bethnal Green side of the historic boundary between Bethnal Green and Whitechapel. 

The pub takes its name from the ballad and legend The Blind Beggar of Bethnal Green. The pub at the junction of the Whitechapel Road (part of the route to Colchester later known as the Great Essex Road) and Cambridge Heath Road is reputed to be built on the site of his begging. 

It is where Ronnie Kray murdered George Cornell in front of witnesses. It is also the location of William Booth's first sermon, which led to the creation of the Salvation Army. It was the nearest outlet (or brewery tap) for the Manns Albion brewery, where the first modern Brown Ale was brewed. The pub was built in 1894 on the site of an inn which had been established before 1654.

History
The pub was built in 1894 on the site of an inn which had been established before 1654, and named after the famous ballad.

In 1865, William Booth preached his first open-air sermon outside the Blind Beggar, which led to the establishment of the East London Christian Mission, later to become the Salvation Army. William Booth is commemorated by a nearby statue.

The Blind Beggar is notorious for its connection to East End gangsters the Kray twins. On 9 March 1966, Ronnie Kray shot and murdered George Cornell, an associate of a rival gang, the Richardsons, as he was sitting at the bar. The murder took place in the then saloon bar.

The pub is also a popular starting point for the Monopoly pub crawl, despite being located on the board's third space.

The pub was frequented by Harry Redknapp and was owned by Bobby Moore at one stage.

Henry de Montfort legend
The pub takes its name from the ballad and legend The Blind Beggar of Bethnal Green.. The pub at the junction of the Whitechapel Road (part of the route from the Aldgate to Colchester later known as the Great Essex Road) and Cambridge Heath Road is reputed to be built on the site of his begging. In some versions of the ballad, the beggar was an impoverished noble Henry de Montfort.

In the Blind Beggar legend, de Montfort was wounded and lost his sight in the Battle of Evesham in 1265 and nursed to health by a baroness, and together they had a child named Besse. He became the "Blind Beggar of Bethnal Green" and used to beg at the crossroads. The story of how he went from landed gentry to poor beggar became popular in the Tudor era, and was revived by Percy's Reliques of Ancient English Poetry, published in 1765. The legend came to be adopted in the arms of the Metropolitan Borough of Bethnal Green in 1900.

References

Citations

Sources

The Salvation Army
Commercial buildings completed in 1894
Tourist attractions in the London Borough of Tower Hamlets
Brewery taps
Pubs in the London Borough of Tower Hamlets
Whitechapel